The Cedarville School Building, also known as the Old Rock School, is a historic school building on Crawford County Road 523 in Cedarville, Arkansas.  It is a single-story rectangular masonry stone structure, with a deck-on-hip roof and a stone foundation.  Its main facade (facing west) has a recessed entry under a slightly-projecting shed roof, with three banks of sash windows to its left.   The school was built in 1931, and initially served as the city's high school.  The building now serves as a community center.

The building was listed on the National Register of Historic Places in 1992.

See also
National Register of Historic Places listings in Crawford County, Arkansas

References

School buildings on the National Register of Historic Places in Arkansas
Buildings and structures in Crawford County, Arkansas
National Register of Historic Places in Crawford County, Arkansas